Lieutenant Colonel Sir Henry Lionel Galway,  (25 September 1859 – 17 June 1949) was a British Army officer and the Governor of South Australia from 18 April 1914 until 30 April 1920. His name was Henry Lionel Gallwey until 1911.

Early life
Henry Lionel Gallwey was born on 25 September 1859 at Alverstoke, Hampshire, England, to Lieutenant General Sir Thomas Lionel Gallwey and his second wife, Alicia Dorinda Lefanu, née MacDougall. He was educated at Cheltenham College.

Military career
After attending the Royal Military College, Sandhurst, Gallwey was commissioned in 1878. He served as an aide-de-camp to the governors of Bermuda, being promoted to captain in 1887.

Gallwey was appointed deputy commissioner and vice-consul in the newly established Oil Rivers Protectorate (later the Niger Coast Protectorate) in 1891. In March 1892, he failed to convince the Oba of Benin, Ovonramwen, into signing a  'treaty of friendship' that would make the Kingdom of Benin a British colony. Instead, the oba issued an edict barring all British officials and traders from entering Benin territories. The 'Gallwey Treaty', although it was never signed, became the legal basis for the Benin Expedition of 1897, which overthrew the Kingdom of Benin. Captain Gallwey commanded one of the three columns of the expedition.

Gallwey was often mentioned in despatches during this time, and was rewarded with the Distinguished Service Order (DSO; 1896), appointment as Companion of the Order of St Michael and St George (CMG; 1899) and promotion to major (1897).

Gallwey was attached as a political officer to the staff of the British Field Force during the Aro-Anglo war from November 1901 until March 1902 and was mentioned in despatches by the High Commissioner to Southern Nigeria.

Given the rank of lieutenant colonel when he was placed on half-pay in 1901, Gallwey retired from the army in December 1902.

Governorships
Gallwey was in November 1902 appointed as governor and commander-in-chief of the island of Saint Helena, where he revived capital punishment. Appointed Knight Commander of the Order of St Michael and St George (KCMG) in 1910, he was transferred to be governor of the Gambia in 1911.

Galway was appointed Governor of South Australia in 1914. He resented the limitations placed upon a constitutional governor, and his governorship was defined by controversy. He managed to anger a wide spectrum of the population. The general public disliked his support of compulsory military training; puritans were angered by his support for gambling and his opposition to prohibition; progressives were infuriated by his opposition to women's enfranchisement; and the political establishment were aghast at his opposition to the White Australia Policy (on the grounds that the Northern Territory needed Asian workers). For this last opinion, he was forced to issue a full retraction and apology. A speech in 1915 in which Galway suggested that trade unionists should be conscripted and sent to the front was widely criticised and gave local cartoonists a field day.

It was eventually Galway's support for conscription that saved his governorship; the legislature decided that his efforts to increase voluntary recruitment for the First World War, as well as his support for conscription referendums, warranted keeping him in the role. A motion in the legislature by the Labor opposition in 1917 calling for the abolition of his office failed.

After the war, Premier Archibald Peake was considering a proposal to build a national war memorial on the site of Government House, Adelaide, with a new vice-regal residence to be purchased in the suburbs. Galway managed to dissuade Peake from this scheme, and the war memorial was built in a corner of the grounds of Government House.

Galway's appointment was not renewed when it expired in 1920; although he was liked by the Adelaide establishment, he had been a spectacularly controversial governor, and the Colonial Office did not give him another post. He returned to England later in 1920.

Personal life
In November 1911, Gallwey changed his surname to 'Galway'. On 26 August 1913 in London he married Baroness Marie Carola Franciska Roselyne d'Erlanger. He died on 17 June 1949.

References

1859 births
1949 deaths
Military personnel from Hampshire
Graduates of the Royal Military College, Sandhurst
Knights Commander of the Order of St Michael and St George
Companions of the Distinguished Service Order
Governors of South Australia
British Army officers
Governors of Saint Helena
Governors of the Gambia
British colonial governors and administrators in Oceania
British colonial governors and administrators in Africa